Solectron Corporation was an electronics manufacturing company for original equipment manufacturers (OEMs). It was the first electronics manufacturing services (EMS) industry in 1977. Solectron's first customer designed and distributed an electronic controller for solar energy equipment. The name "Solectron" was a portmanteau of the words "solar" and "electronics".

Solectron had sales of around $12 billion a year, and employed 70,000 people in 23 countries. The company was acquired by Flex on October 15, 2007.

History
Solectron was established in 1977 to provide outsourced manufacturing services to third parties. It was a major manufacturer, but you would have not found its name on any products. Solectron founders Roy Kusumoto and Prabhat Jain saw a growing number of electronics companies in California's Silicon Valley. There was a need to provide printed circuit board assembly (PCBA) services, handling the manufacturing overflow from OEMs. Solectron aimed to provide high-tech companies the ability for their products to be produced and delivered more quickly and efficiently than their competition, and believed that their customers needed a greater level of service for assembly and manufacture of printed circuit boards, cellular phones, along the entire product supply chain.

Management succession
Michael R. Cannon was named president and chief executive officer in January 2003.

References

External links

1977 establishments in California
2007 disestablishments in California
2007 mergers and acquisitions
Companies formerly listed on the New York Stock Exchange
Computer companies disestablished in 2007
Computer companies established in 1977
Defunct companies based in the San Francisco Bay Area
Defunct computer companies of the United States
Electronics companies disestablished in 2007
Electronics companies established in 1977
Electronics companies of the United States
NCR Corporation
Technology companies based in the San Francisco Bay Area
Technology companies disestablished in 2007
Technology companies established in 1977